Configurations is an academic journal established in 1993 and the official publication of the Society for Literature, Science, and the Arts. It covers the study of discourse in science, technology, and medicine and investigates the relationship between literature and the arts and science and technology.

External links 
 
 Society for Literature, Science, and Arts
 Configurations  at Project MUSE

References

Literary magazines published in the United States
Philosophy of science journals
Publications established in 1993
Johns Hopkins University Press academic journals
English-language journals
Triannual journals